Two presidential elections were held in Poland in 1926. They followed the May Coup, which forced President Stanisław Wojciechowski and Prime Minister Wincenty Witos to resign and gave effective power to coup leader, Marshal Józef Piłsudski.

According to then Constitution President was elected by joint houses of Sejm and Senate (National Assembly).

31 May

There were two candidates: Piłsudski and supported by the National Democracy, Christian Democracy and Piast Adolf Bniński, Voivode of Poznań. Several other politicians were mentioned to run, most notably ousted President Wojciechowski, Sejm Marshal and now Acting President Maciej Rataj (Polish People's Party "Piast") and Senate Marshal Wojciech Trąmpczyński (National Democracy), but they declined to run.

Piłsudski was endorsed by left-wing groups and Biński was endorsed by national democracy.

Piłsudski defeated Biński in a single round:

1 June
Piłsudski, now President-elect, declined to take office due to minor powers vested by the constitution.  He proposed the candidacy of politically unknown Ignacy Mościcki, a well known chemist.  Due to Mościcki's lack of experience and his devotion to Piłsudski, this move assured loyalty of the next President to the de facto leader.

The Polish Socialist Party, who had previously supported Piłsudski, filed their candidate:- Sejm Caucus Chair Zygmunt Marek, a man who had officially nominated Piłsudski a day earlier. Bniński ran again.

Mościcki accepted his election.

References
Zygmunt Kaczmarek, Trzej prezydenci II Rzeczypospolitej, Instytut Wydawniczy Związków Zawodowych, Warszawa 1988

Presidential elections in Poland
1926 in Poland
Poland
May 1926 events
June 1926 events